Russian Signal Troops is the signal corps of the Russian Ground Forces.

The Signal Troops are an integral part of the Armed Forces. Its condition and functioning largely influences efficiency of command, the timeliness of combat equipment and weapons. In its development, the Signal Troops has come a long and difficult process that is inextricably linked with the history of the Armed Forces, the changes in the forms and methods of their use and the improvement of military art. From simple audio and visual means of communication for the transmission of signals and commands on the battlefield to widely branched multi-channel, advanced automated systems that can provide a link of virtually unlimited range of both stationary and moving objects on the ground, in the water, under the water and in the air, this is the historical path of development and improvement of military communications. Communication on the battlefield is one of the main types of operational support.

History
Due to the spatial scale of hostilities, the communication problem in the military in the 19th century acquired great importance. In the Imperial Russian Army the first attempts to introduce the telegraph took place during the Russian-Turkish war of 1877-1878, and it brought along with it enormous benefit in the management of troops, they have led to greater use of means of communication. Telegraphs and telephones occupied a prominent place in the management of troops, with the most widely developed mobile lines for leading troops directly in the war theater. At the end of the 19th century  the military telegraph and telephone park consisting of units directly administered by the Chief Engineer's Office, operated lines in Central Russia - 17 lines (975 miles) and the Caucasus - two (130 miles). In addition, the fortresses were given 55 communication nodes (423 miles). 

In February 1905, in the Red Village, where there was a military warehouse of radios purchased abroad, was sent a group of officers, graduates of military signalers electrical schools to train stations to study the experience of command and control in combat conditions. Already in March 1905, these officers were sent to fight in the Russo-Japanese war that spring, and were integrated into the regular forces of the Army.

In 1912, the Signals Corps was raised as a separate arm, with Corps units in the Army. These Corps consists of two signals divisions (8 infantry regiments in 4 brigades), one signals battalion (one and three sapper telegraph company) and one field engineering department park was stocked with 20 telegraphs, 193 telegraphs and 333 cable lines. The Corps fought bravely in the actions of the First World War.

After the October Revolution and as the Russian Civil War had dawned in 1918, the Red Army officially reorganized the Russian Signals Corps, and October 20, 1919 they were officially recognized as special troops, as signals units distinguished themselves in action during the Civil War days. In 1941, during the Great Patriotic War, the post of the Chief of Signals Troops was created by orders of the People's Commissariat for Defense, the office holder would later acquire Marshal rank in 1944 (3 more generals would be promoted to Marshal of Signals Troops after the war).

Units (2017)

 1st Headquarters Brigade (Sertolovo) (Western Military District) (:ru:1-я бригада управления)
 9th Guards Headquarters Brigade (Voronezh) (20th Guards Combined Arms Army)
 34th Headquarters Brigade (Vladikavkaz) (58th Combined Arms Army)
 35th Headquarters Brigade (Kochenyovo) (41st Combined Arms Army)
 38th Guards Communications Brigade (Moscow Oblast) (Russian Airborne Forces)
 54th Headquarters Brigade (Belogorsk) (35th Combined Arms Army)
 59th Headquarters Brigade (Yekaterinburg) (Central Military District)
 60th Headquarters Brigade (Selyatino and Odintsovo) (1st Guards Tank Army)
66th Headquarters Brigade (Afipsky) (49th Combined Arms Army)
75th Headquarters Brigade (Ulan-Ude) (36th Combined Arms Army)
80th Headquarters Brigade (Ussuriysk) (5th Combined Arms Army)
91st Headquarters Brigade (Samara) (2nd Guards Tank Army)
95th Headquarters Brigade (Saint Petersburg) (6th Combined Arms Army)
101st Headquarters Brigade (Chita, Zabaykalsky Krai) (29th Combined Arms Army)
104th Headquarters Brigade (Khabarovsk) (Eastern Military District)
132nd Signal Brigade (Agalatovo) (6th Combined Arms Army)
175th Headquarters Brigade (Aksay) (Southern Military District)
176th Headquarters Brigade (Novocherkassk)
179th Headquarters Brigade (Yekaterinburg, Verkhnyaya Pyshma) (Central Military District)

See also
Budyonny Military Academy of the Signal Corps
Telegraph troops

References

External links

Army units and formations of Russia
Military communications corps
Signals intelligence agencies
Electronic warfare
Russian Ground Forces
Military units and formations established in 1877
1877 establishments in the Russian Empire